Wilfred Theodore "Bill" Houle (July 14, 1901 – December 26, 1974) was an American football player and coach of football, basketball, and baseball. He played for one season, in 1924, for the Minneapolis Marines of the National Football League (NFL). Houle served as the head football coach at Saint John's University in Collegeville, Minnesota from 1925 to 1929, compiling a record of 7–22–3. He was also the head basketball coach at Saint John's from 1925 to 1930, amassing a record of 34–36, and the school's head baseball coach from 1926 to 1930, tallying a mark of 34–36.

Head coaching record

Football

References

External links
 

1901 births
1974 deaths
American football quarterbacks
American football defensive backs
Minneapolis Marines players
St. Thomas (Minnesota) Tommies football players
Saint John's Johnnies baseball coaches
Saint John's Johnnies basketball coaches
Saint John's Johnnies football coaches
Coaches of American football from Minnesota
Players of American football from Minnesota
Baseball coaches from Minnesota
Basketball coaches from Minnesota